Cordon may refer to:

Basic meanings
 Cordon (fashion), a cord (sewing) or braid used as a fastening or ornament
 Cordon (plant), the descriptive term for a particular style of pruning woody plants
 a strip of clay added around the outside of a pot in ceramic technology
 Cordon sanitaire, a line to isolate an area, event or person
 Cordon and search, a military operation
 Kettling, the use of cordons of police to contain a crowd

Geography
 Cordon (Arran), a village on the Isle of Arran
 Cordón, a neighbourhood (barrio) of Montevideo, Uruguay
 Cordon, Haute-Savoie, a commune in France
 Cordon, Isabela, a municipality in the Philippines

Buildings
Casa del Cordón, Santo Domingo, Dominican Republic, it is the oldest European stone house in the Americas and probably the first European two-story house.
Casa del Cordón, Vitoria-Gasteiz, Basque Country, Spain

Other
 Cordón Industrial, a Chilean organ of popular power, direct or workers democracy
 Slips cordon, a formation of slip fielders in cricket
The Cordon, Romanian film
 Cordon (TV series), a 2014 Belgian TV series

See also
 Cordon Bleu (disambiguation)
Coridon (disambiguation)